Mathieu Herbaut (born November 9, 2000), better known as ZywOo, is a French professional Counter-Strike: Global Offensive player for Team Vitality. He is considered one of the best players in Global Offensive history, having been ranked the No. 1 player in the world by HLTV in 2019 and 2020. He is also sometimes nicknamed "The Chosen One" due to being born on the day of the original Counter Strike game's commercial release.

Early life 
He started playing at age 7 with his brother, but was only allowed to play for less than an hour per day by his mother. After becoming a teenager, he still never "played in the middle of the night" or "did 4-5 hour sessions", his family always keeping an eye on what he was doing.
His mother also encouraged him to get into video games, and from time to time even played with him. But before allowing him to participate in esports, she demanded that he first finish his secondary education and acquire his baccalauréat, which he did.

Career

2018 
After completing his baccalauréat, Mathieu was able to take up esports professionally, joining Team Vitality in October. The results came quickly, as they won DreamHack Open Atlanta 2018 in November. The next month, he and his team qualified for the minor qualifier for the next Major, Katowice Major 2019. In the Minors, Vitality landed in second place, securing a spot for the Major in Katowice.

2019 
The results of ZywOo and his team were not that brilliant in the Majors: as they ended up finishing in 9-11th in Katowice Major 2019 and then a 5-8th place in StarLadder Berlin Major 2019. They still went on to win in two top-tier tournaments of the season, ECS Season 7 Finals and EPICENTER 2019, and finished second twice at ESL One Cologne 2019 and DreamHack Masters Malmö 2019.

Mathieu's individual stats were impressive for that year: he finished MVP 5 times and had a 1.30 overall rating in LAN events. In January 2020, Mathieu Herbaut was chosen as the World's Best Player of the Year 2019 by HLTV.org, thus becoming the first French and the youngest player to receive this award since its inception in 2010, and matching Marcelo 'coldzera' David's feat of receiving it in his first full year as a professional player.

2020 
During 2020, many tournaments either transitioned to an online format or did not take place, due to COVID-19. Mathieu became the #1 player on HLTV.org's ranking for the second time in a row, with Natus Vincere's Oleksandr 's1mple' Kostyliev, and Nicolai 'device' Reedtz from Astralis behind him.

2021 
After qualifying for the PGL Major Stockholm 2021, Team Vitality would lose against Natus Vincere during the quarter finals, and place 5th in the major. He was ranked the 2nd best player of 2021 by HLTV, with s1mple claiming the #1 spot.

2022 
Team Vitality dropped out of the PGL Major Antwerp 2022 on day 5, losing against Heroic. He was ranked the 2nd best player of 2022 by HLTV, with s1mple claiming the #1 spot.

Awards and recognition 
 #1 player of 2019 by HLTV.
 #1 player of 2020 by HLTV.
 #2 player  of 2021 by HLTV.
 #2 player  of 2022 by HLTV.
 12 HLTV MVP medals.

References

External links 
 Facebook
 Youtube
 Instagram
 Twitter

2000 births
Living people
Counter-Strike players
French esports players
Team Vitality players